Grants/Cibola County Schools is a school district based in Grants, New Mexico, United States.

Attendance area
GCCS's attendance boundary includes most of Cibola County, New Mexico, including the city of Grants. Exceptions are areas on the Zuni Reservation and Fence Lake. While the Ramah Navajo Indian Reservation is physically within Grants/Cibola County Schools, children going to non-tribal public schools are bussed to Ramah's schools, which are operated by the Gallup-McKinley County Schools.

Schools

Secondary schools

6-12 schools
 Laguna Acoma Middle High School

High schools
 Grants High School

Middle schools
 Los Alamitos Middle School

Primary schools
Bluewater Elementary School
Cubero Elementary School
Mesa View Elementary School (Grants)
Mesa View is one of two elementary schools in Grants, NM. It along with Mount Taylor Elementary serve Grants. Mesa View was founded in 1940, and today has over 400 children attending.
Milan Elementary School (Milan)
Mount Taylor Elementary School (Grants)
San Rafael Elementary School 
Seboyeta Elementary School

References

External links
 Grants/Cibola County Schools

School districts in New Mexico
Education in Cibola County, New Mexico